The women's 63 kilograms (half middleweight) competition at the 2010 Asian Games in Guangzhou was held on 14 November at the Huagong Gymnasium.

Yoshie Ueno of Japan won the gold medal.

Schedule
All times are China Standard Time (UTC+08:00)

Results

Main bracket

Repechage

References

Results

External links
 
 Draw

W63
Judo at the Asian Games Women's Half Middleweight
Asian W63